Pictodiloma is a genus of sea snails, marine gastropod mollusks in the family Trochidae, the top snails.

Species
Species within the genus Pictodiloma include:
 Pictodiloma suavis (Philippi, 1850)

References

 Williams S.T., Donald K.M., Spencer H.G. & Nakano T. (2010) Molecular systematics of the marine gastropod families Trochidae and Calliostomatidae (Mollusca: Superfamily Trochoidea). Molecular Phylogenetics and Evolution 54:783-809

 
Trochidae